Allein; is a town and comune in the Aosta Valley region of northwestern Italy.

Geography

Notes and references

Cities and towns in Aosta Valley